Neagoe Basarab (c.1459 – 15 September 1521) was the Voivode (Prince) of Wallachia between 1512 and 1521. Born into the boyar family of the Craiovești (his reign marks the climax of the family's political influence) as the son of Pârvu Craiovescu or Basarab Țepeluș cel Tânăr, Neagoe Basarab, who replaced Vlad cel Tânăr after the latter rejected Craioveşti tutelage, was noted for his abilities and competence. He is sometimes mentioned as Neagoe Basarab IV, due to other Wallachian rulers by the name Basarab (not Neagoe Basarab!) preceding him on the throne, some of them certain members of the House of Basarab and some less so.

Reign

In the 16th century, Wallachia was independent, but was required to pay an exorbitant tribute to the greater force of the Ottoman Empire. Neagoe encouraged the development of crafts and trade, while maintaining a good relation with Wallachia's other powerful neighbour, Hungary.

His diplomacy attempted to establish connections with the Republic of Venice and the Papacy, even offering to mediate the dispute between Eastern Orthodoxy and Roman Catholicism, with the purpose of uniting Christendom against the Ottoman threat.

He adopted the Byzantine tradition of Church patronage, making generous donations to the Orthodox monasteries, not only in Wallachia but throughout the Balkans. During his reign the Curtea de Argeș Monastery was built (in 1517) – legend names Meșterul Manole as the chief craftsman; the account also fuses Neagoe with yet another legendary figure, Prince Radu (who would've caused Manole's death by ordering for the scaffolding to be removed while the builders were on the roof, ensuring that nobody would use Manole's craft, and thus preserving the uniqueness of the structure).

Neagoe ordered the earliest works on the old Metropolitan church in Târgoviște (the city where the edition of the Gospels was published in 1512) and St. Nicholas Church in Șcheii Brașovului.

Neagoe Basarab wrote in Church Slavonic one of the earliest literary works of Wallachia, called "The teachings of Neagoe Basarab to his son Theodosie" (translated in Romanian as Învățăturile lui Neagoe Basarab către fiul său Teodosie), where he touches various subjects such as philosophy, diplomacy, morals and ethics.

Family
He married Milica Despina, daughter of Serbia. Among their children are Teodosie of Wallachia and Ruxandra, wife of Radu of Afumați and Radu Paisie, both princes of Wallachia.

Canonisation
On 8 July 2008, the Holy Synod of the Romanian Orthodox Church officially canonised Neagoe Basarab. His feast day is celebrated every year on 26 September.

See also
 26th Infantry Battalion "Neagoe Basarab"

Literature

Notes

"Sfântul Voievod Neagoe Basarab, prinţ al păcii" ("Holy Voivode Neagoe Basarab, Prince of Peace", in Romanian), Alexandru Briciu for Ziarul Lumina newspaper of the Romanian Orthodox Church, Bucharest, 26 September 2009.

|-

Rulers of Wallachia
16th-century rulers in Europe
Early Modern Romanian writers
1521 deaths
16th-century Romanian people
1521 in Romania
Year of birth unknown
1459 births